Boris Kuzmich Novikov (13 July 1925, Ryazhsk, Ryazan Governorate, RSFSR —  25 July 1997, Moscow) was a Soviet actor of theater and cinema. People's Artist of Russia (1994).

Biography 
Boris Kuzmich Novikov was born on 13 July 1925 in a family of laborers at the station Ryazhsk-1, Ryazan Oblast. In school years he participated in amateur performances, and later fought at the front.

He graduated from the School-Studio of Yuri Zavadsky in 1948.
Since 1948 he worked as an actor of the Mossovet Theater, in 1963-1972 was the actor of the Moscow Satire Theatre.

In 1972, due to diabetic illness, he stopped playing in theatre and only worked in film. He played in over 150 films and also voiced animated films. Novikov is well known as an actor of episodic roles, and was dubbed as the "King of the Episode". Novikov had leading roles in the film adaptation of Alexander Pushkin's Shot, in the comedy Seven Old Men and a Girl, historical film The Shadows Fade at Noon, drama Father and Son, comedy The Talking Monkey.

The last picture in which Boris Novikov starred was the adventure film The Return of the Battleship, released in the year of his death.

He died of complications from diabetes on 25 July 1997 in Moscow. The actor was buried at the Danilovsky Cemetery in Moscow.

Personal life 
His wife was Nadezhda Antonovna Klimovich (died in 2008), an actress of the Moscow Youth Theater. They had a son Sergei, born in 1949.

Selected filmography
 1955: Behind the Shop Window as bully (uncredited)
 1957: And Quiet Flows the Don as Mitka Korshunov
 1958: A Girl with a Guitar as Tsyplakov
 1961: Chronicle of Flaming Years  as Mandryka
 1961: The Cossacks as Nazarka
 1961: Scarlet Sails as painter
 1961: My Friend, Kolka! as Kuzma
 1966: A Pistol Shot as Kuzka
 1968: Seven Old Men and a Girl as Stepan Bubnov
 1969: The Adjutant of His Excellency as Isaac Liberson, the Kiev jeweler
 1981: The Suicide Club, or the Adventures of a Titled Person as General Wendeler
 1983: The Trust That Went Bust as The artillerist
 1983: Crazy Day of Engineer Barkasov as stoker
 1983: White Dew as Timofei

Honours and awards
 Medal "For Valiant Labour in the Great Patriotic War 1941–1945"
 Medal "In Commemoration of the 800th Anniversary of Moscow"

References

External links

Борис Новиков

1925 births
1997 deaths
People from Ryazan Oblast
People from Ryazhsky Uyezd
Soviet male film actors
Russian male film actors
Soviet male voice actors
Russian male voice actors
Honored Artists of the RSFSR
People's Artists of Russia
Deaths from diabetes